The 34th Annual American Music Awards were held on November 21, 2006. They were hosted by Jimmy Kimmel. The awards recognized the most popular albums and artists from the year of 2005–2006. As usual, the ceremony was broadcast by ABC.

Musical performances

Winners and nominees

References 

2006
2006 music awards